Special operations capable may refer to:
 Special operations-capable forces, a term used by the British Armed Forces
 Maritime Special Operations Capable (MARSOC), a term used by the Royal Netherlands Marine Corps
 Marine expeditionary unit (special operations capable) (MEU(SOC)), a term that was formerly used by the United States Marine Corps